Irina Serova (born 14 May 1966, born Irina Rozhkova) is an Austrian retired badminton player who initially played Badminton for Soviet Russia and later moved on to represent Austria. Serova, in her fairly long career of around 16 years won many International titles which includes in former USSR, former Czechoslovakia, Cyprus, Bulgaria, Ireland, Czechia, Malta, Hungary, Canada, Netherlands, Poland, Germany and Slovenia besides some runner-up performances in Portugal, France, England, Austria and United States. She is also a numerous time USSR national champion and Austrian national champion as well.

Achievements

IBF World Grand Prix 
The World Badminton Grand Prix sanctioned by International Badminton Federation (IBF) since 1983.

Women's singles

Mixed doubles

IBF International 
Women's singles

Women's doubles

Mixed doubles

References 

1966 births
Living people
Austrian female badminton players